Nadvi, signifying association with the Darul Uloom Nadwatul Ulama in India, may refer to one of the following:

Abdul Bari Nadvi, Indian Muslim scholar
Abdullah Abbas Nadwi, Indian Islamic scholar 
Mohammad Akram Nadwi, Indian Islamic scholar
Rabey Hasani Nadvi, Indian Islamic scholar, president of All India Muslim Personal Law Board
Saeed-ur-Rahman Azmi Nadvi, Indian Islamic scholar, principal of Darul Uloom Nadwatul Ulama
Sultan Zauq Nadvi, Bangladeshi Islamic scholar, author and founder of Jamia Darul Ma'arif Al-Islamia
Syed Abul Hasan Ali Hasani Nadwi Indian Islamic scholar
Syed Ehtisham Ahmed Nadvi, Indian Islamic scholar
Syed Sulaiman Nadvi, Indian and Pakistani historian
Shihabuddin Nadvi, Indian Muslim scholar

See also 
 Nadwi, alternative transcription

Indian surnames
Urdu-language surnames
Toponymic surnames
People from Lucknow
Nisbas
Arabic-language surnames
Islamic scholars